Ralph A. Ogden (born January 25, 1948) is a retired American professional basketball player who played in the National Basketball Association (NBA). Ogden played for one season with the San Francisco Warriors. He recorded career totals of 42 points, 32 rebounds and 9 assists.

Ogden spent his prep years playing at Lincoln High School in San Jose, California. In 1965 and 1966, he earned All-CCS and All-Northern California honors. During his senior season, he guided the Lions to an unblemished 29–0 record and the Peninsula Basketball Championship title.

Ogden played college basketball at Santa Clara, and for two seasons he played alongside his older brother, Bud. Bud was a consensus First Team All-American as a senior in 1968–69. In Ogden's career, he scored 1,280 points while averaging 15.8 points per game. In the two seasons the Ogden brothers played together (1967–68 and 1968–69), the Broncos went 49–6, won two Pac-8 Conference championships and made it to the NCAA Division I men's basketball tournament's West regional finals twice (both times losing to the Lew Alcindor-led and eventual national champion UCLA Bruins). 

Ogden was selected in the 4th round (53rd overall) of the 1970 NBA draft by the San Francisco Warriors, then played one season with them before being waived. Although he was finished with his NBA career, Ogden would go on to play and then coach professional basketball in Germany for more than 30 years. One of the teams he played for was Oldenburger TB, and in 1976 he helped the team move up to the top division in the Bundesliga by virtue of their record.

Personal
Ogden's father, Carlos Ogden, Sr., fought in World War II and earned one Medal of Honor, three Purple Hearts and one Bronze Star Medal. He has three brothers – Bud, who also played in the NBA, Jim and Fred.

References

1948 births
Living people
American expatriate basketball people in Germany
American men's basketball players
Basketball players from San Jose, California
People from San Luis Obispo, California
San Francisco Warriors draft picks
San Francisco Warriors players
Santa Clara Broncos men's basketball players
Small forwards